Doto paulinae is a species of sea slug, a nudibranch, a marine gastropod mollusc in the family Dotidae.

Distribution
This species was described from Genova, Italy in the Mediterranean Sea.

Description
The body of this nudibranch is mostly transparent white in colour with cream coloured organs showing through the skin. There is a band of dark pigment along the midline of the back and extending into the inner surfaces of the rhinophore sheaths and a similar area of dark pigment on the inner faces of the cerata. Each ceratal tubercle is covered with a dark pigment patch, except for the elongate terminal tubercle which is transparent, showing white glandular bodies concentrated below the surface.

EcologyDoto paulinae has been reported to feed on colonies of the hydroid, Obelia geniculata (family Campanulariidae). Recent finds in France were of animals matching Trinchese's description but feeding on Aglaophenia''.

References

Dotidae
Gastropods described in 1881